Zindabad (জিন্দাবাদ) is a suffix of Persian origin which is used in Odia, Punjabi, Bengali and Urdu as a shout of encouragement or as a cheer, and literally means "Long live [idea or person]". It is often used as a political slogan, to praise a country, movement or leader may refer to:

Zindabad may refer to:

Politicals
 Inquilab Zindabad, a pro-revolution slogan
 Khalistan Zindabad Force, Punjab independence campaigners
 Bangladesh Zindabad, a patriotic slogan in Bangladesh 
 Pakistan Zindabad, a patriotic slogan in Pakistan
 Hindustan Zindabad, a patriotic slogan in India

Films
 Dulavai Zindabad, a 2017 Bengali film
 Jawani Zindabad, a 1990 Hindi film
 Mazdoor Zindabaad, a 1976 Hindi film
 Rakthasakshikal Sindabad, a 1998 Malayalam film
 Sasura Ghara Zindabad, a 2010 Oriya film screenplay
 Sasurbari Zindabad, a 2000 Bengali film
 Shankar Dada Zindabad, a 2007 Telugu film
 Shoshurbari Zindabad, a 2002 Bengali film
 Swantham Bharya Zindabad, a 2010 Malayalam film

Music
 "Pakistan Zindabad", a Bengali patriotic song which used to be the anthem of East Pakistan (now Bangladesh)